The Leading Group for National Defence and Military Reform of the Central Military Commission is a policy formulation and implementation body set up under the Central Military Commission and ultimately answerable to the Central Committee of the Chinese Communist Party for the purpose of formulating policies related to military reform. The group is headed by Xi Jinping, General Secretary of the Chinese Communist Party and Chairman of the Central Military Commission.

The decision to introduce wide-ranging military reforms was discussed in the communique of the 3rd Plenum of the 18th Central Committee in 2013. The Leading Group held its first meeting on March 15, 2014.

Membership 
 Leader
 Xi Jinping (General Secretary of the CCP Central Committee, Chairman of the Central Military Commission)

 Executive Deputy Leader
 Air Force General Xu Qiliang (Politburo member, Vice Chairman of the Central Military Commission)

 Deputy Leader
 General Zhang Youxia (Politburo member, Vice Chairman of the Central Military Commission)

See also 
 People's Republic of China military reform

References 

Central Military Commission (China)
Leading groups of the Chinese Communist Party
2014 establishments in China